Sena Pavetić (born 12 January 1986 in Osijek, SFR Yugoslavia) is a former Croatian female basketball player.

External links
Profile at eurobasket.com 

1986 births
Living people
Sportspeople from Osijek
Croatian women's basketball players
Centers (basketball)
ŽKK Gospić players
ŽKK Novi Zagreb players
Mediterranean Games bronze medalists for Croatia
Mediterranean Games medalists in basketball
Competitors at the 2009 Mediterranean Games